Espresso is the codename of the 32-bit central processing unit (CPU) used in Nintendo's Wii U video game console. It was designed by IBM, and was produced using a 45 nm silicon-on-insulator process. The Espresso chip resides together with a GPU from AMD on an MCM manufactured by Renesas. It was revealed at E3 2011 in June 2011 and released in November 2012.

Design 

IBM and Nintendo have revealed that the Espresso processor is a PowerPC-based microprocessor with three cores on a single chip to reduce power consumption and increase speed. The CPU and the graphics processor are placed on a single substrate as a multi-chip module (MCM) to reduce complexity, increase the communication speed between the chips, further reduce power consumption and reduce cost and space required. The two chips were assembled to the complete MCM by Renesas in Japan. Espresso itself was manufactured by IBM in its 300 mm plant in East Fishkill, New York, using 45 nm SOI-technology and embedded DRAM (eDRAM) for caches.

While unverified by Nintendo, hackers, teardowns, and unofficial informants have since revealed more information about the Espresso, such as its name, size and speed. The microarchitecture seems to be quite similar to its predecessors the Broadway and Gekko, i.e. PowerPC 750 based, but enhanced with larger and faster caches and multiprocessor support.

Rumors that the Wii U CPU was derived from IBM's high-end POWER7 server processor proved false, as it would potentially increase the manufacturing and retail cost of the system, and require a larger form factor. Espresso shares some technology with POWER7, such as eDRAM and general instruction set similarities, but those are superficial similarities.

Specifications 

 Out-of-order execution PowerPC based cores
 45 nanometer process technology
 IBM silicon on insulator (SOI) technology
 Backward compatible with the Broadway and Gekko processors

The following specifications have not been officially confirmed by either Nintendo or IBM. They have been obtained by reverse engineering by hacker Hector Martin, alias marcan.

Broadway-based core architecture
Three cores at 1.243125 GHz
Symmetric multiprocessing with MESI/MERSI support
Each core can output up to 4 instructions per clock using superscalar parallelism.
32-bit integer unit
64-bit floating-point (or 2× 32-bit SIMD, often found under the denomination "paired singles")
A total of 3 MB of Level 2 cache in an unusual configuration.
Core 0: 512 KB, core 1: 2 MB, core 2: 512 KB
4 stage pipeline 
7 stage pipeline - FP
6 Execution Units per core (18 EUs total)
Die size: 4.74 mm × 5.85 mm = 27.73 mm2

References

Further reading 
 Wii U graphics power finally revealed 
 Nintendo exec denies Wii U processor is 'a little poor'
 First page of developer's user manual 

Nintendo chips
IBM microprocessors
PowerPC microprocessors